Arne Røgden (born May 16, 1917 - January 1, 2002) was a Norwegian bobsledder who competed during the 1950s. Competing in two Winter Olympics, he earned his best finish of 11th in the four-man event at Cortina d'Ampezzo in 1956.

He was born in Oslo and died in Bærum.

References
1952 bobsleigh four-man results
1956 bobsleigh two-man results
1956 bobsleigh four-man results
Bobsleigh four-man results: 1948-64.

External links

1917 births
2002 deaths
Bobsledders at the 1952 Winter Olympics
Bobsledders at the 1956 Winter Olympics
Norwegian male bobsledders
Olympic bobsledders of Norway
Sportspeople from Oslo